Morecambe & Wise: There's No Answer to That! is the second book by Eric Morecambe and Ernie Wise and was published in 1981 as a follow up to the earlier book, Eric & Ernie : The Autobiography Of Morecambe & Wise, which had been released in 1973 in paperback form. This second volume was available in both hard and soft back.

1981 non-fiction books
British autobiographies
Morecambe and Wise
Show business memoirs
Collaborative autobiographies